Christ Church is in Crewe Road, Wheelock, Cheshire, England.  It is an active Anglican parish church in the deanery of Congleton, the archdeaconry of Macclesfield, and the diocese of Chester.  Its benefice is united with those of St John the Evangelist, Sandbach Heath, and St Philip, Hassall Green.

History

The nave of the church was built in 1836 as a chapel of ease.  It was dedicated to Christ in 1843 by the Bishop of Chester.  The chancel was added in 1903, the architect being Alfred Price.

Architecture
The church is constructed in brick.  Its windows are lancets, with a triple lancet at the west end.  Also at the west end is a gabled bellcote.

External features
In the church yard is a stone war memorial dating from about 1920 with a soldier in battledress.

References

Church of England church buildings in Cheshire
Diocese of Chester
Gothic Revival church buildings in England
Gothic Revival architecture in Cheshire